The 1962 Chicago Cubs season was the 91st season of the Chicago Cubs franchise, the 87th in the National League and the 47th at Wrigley Field. In the second season under their College of Coaches, the Cubs finished ninth in the National League with a record of 59–103, 42½ games behind the NL Champion San Francisco Giants. The Cubs finished ahead of the expansion New York Mets and behind the expansion Houston Colt .45s in the NL's first 162-game season.

Offseason 
 October 10, 1961: 1961 MLB expansion draft
Don Zimmer was drafted from the Cubs by the New York Mets.
Ed Bouchee was drafted from the Cubs by the New York Mets.
 Prior to 1962 season: J. C. Hartman was returned by the Cubs to the Houston Buffaloes after the expiration of their minor league working agreement.

Regular season

Season standings

Record vs. opponents

Notable transactions 
 April 26, 1962: Paul Casanova was released by the Cubs.
 April 26, 1962: Sammy Taylor was traded by the Cubs to the New York Mets for Bob Smith.
 June 5, 1962: Bob Smith and Daryl Robertson were traded by the Cubs to the St. Louis Cardinals for Alex Grammas and Don Landrum.

Roster

Player stats

Batting

Starters by position 
Note: Pos = Position; G = Games played; AB = At bats; H = Hits; Avg. = Batting average; HR = Home runs; RBI = Runs batted in

Other batters 
Note: G = Games played; AB = At bats; H = Hits; Avg. = Batting average; HR = Home runs; RBI = Runs batted in

Pitching

Starting pitchers 
Note: G = Games pitched; IP = Innings pitched; W = Wins; L = Losses; ERA = Earned run average; SO = Strikeouts

Other pitchers 
Note: G = Games pitched; IP = Innings pitched; W = Wins; L = Losses; ERA = Earned run average; SO = Strikeouts

Relief pitchers 
Note: G = Games pitched; W = Wins; L = Losses; SV = Saves; ERA = Earned run average; SO = Strikeouts

Farm system 

LEAGUE CHAMPIONS: WenatcheeSalt Lake City affiliation shared with Cleveland Indians

Notes

References 

1962 Chicago Cubs season at Baseball Reference

Chicago Cubs seasons
Chicago Cubs season
Chicago Cubs